The 1984 Western Michigan Broncos football team represented Western Michigan University in the Mid-American Conference (MAC) during the 1984 NCAA Division I-A football season.  In their third season under head coach Jack Harbaugh, the Broncos compiled a 5–6 record (3–6 against MAC opponents), finished in a tie for eighth place in the MAC, and outscored their opponents, 234 to 213.  The team played its home games at Waldo Stadium in Kalamazoo, Michigan.

The team's statistical leaders included Steve Hoffman with 1,732 passing yards, Otis Cheathem with 778 rushing yards, and Cliff Reed with 591 receiving yards. Defensive tackle Jeff Kacmarek and tackle Tom Toth were the team captains. Linebacker John Offerdahl received the team's most outstanding player award.

Schedule

References

Western Michigan
Western Michigan Broncos football seasons
Western Michigan Broncos football